Blastomonas natatoria  is a Gram-negative bacterium from the genus Blastomonas.

References 

Sphingomonadales